Utvær is an island group in Solund Municipality in Vestland county, Norway. It is the westernmost archipelago in Norway. The main residential area on the rocky islands is also called Utvær. It lies on the western side of the Sognesjøen which is the mouth of the vast Sognefjorden. The entire archipelago is protected as the Utvær nature reserve.

Historically, Utvær had a very robust fishing industry and in 1858, the greater Utvær area was split off from the municipality of Eivindvig to become its own municipality known as Utvær. On 1 July 1890, the municipality's name was changed and now the municipality is known as Solund.

Holmebåen is the westernmost point in Norway (when you don't count Jan Mayen). It is located on the island of Steinsøy in the western part of Utvær.  Utvær Lighthouse is also located in the island group. The old Utvær Chapel was historically located in Utvær as well, but it has since been moved closer to the mainland.

History
In 1066, King Harald Hardråde gathered his naval forces at Utvær as he prepared for an invasion of England. He took 200 naval boats plus supply boats from Utvær and its surrounding islands and sailed to the southwest towards England.

Media gallery

See also
List of islands of Norway

References

Solund
Islands of Vestland